Alan Richardson, Allan Richardson, or Allen Richardson may refer to:

Sportspeople
 Alan Richardson (boxer) (born 1948), English boxer
 Alan Richardson (cricketer) (born 1975), English cricketer
 Alan Richardson (footballer, born 1940) (1940–2015), known as Bull Richardson, Australian rules footballer for Richmond and South Melbourne
 Alan Richardson (footballer, born 1965), Australian rules coach of St Kilda and former Collingwood footballer

Musicians
 Alan Richardson (composer) (1904–1978), Scottish pianist and composer
 Allen Richardson, musician in A Band Called Pain
 Allen Richardson, musician in The Natural Four

Others
 Alan Richardson (priest) (1905–1975), Dean of York
 Allan Richardson, photographer on Seeking the Magic Mushroom

See also
Al Richardson (disambiguation)